George Ishak is an Egyptian politician and activist. During the later part of Hosni Mubarak's presidency, he co-founded the grassroots Kefaya opposition movement.

Following the 2011 Egyptian Revolution that toppled Mubarak, Issac became a member of the Constitution Party and a critic of President Mohamed Morsi, elected in 2012. He is a member of the Coptic Catholic Church.

Early years
Born and raised in Port Said, Ishak graduated from Cairo University with a BA in history and began his career as a history teacher, headmaster and later as a consultant. Politically active at a young age, he was a member of Egypt's Constitution Party.

Political activism
Ishak was a founding member and first general coordinator of the Kefaya opposition group, the movement organised the first protest against Mubarak rule. Ishak was later a member of the National Association for Change, a grassroots coalition which prior to the 2011 revolution drew its support from across Egypt’s political spectrum. It was a platform for protest against Hosni Mubarak’s presidency; political corruption and stagnation; "the blurring of the lines between power and wealth; and human rights."

During the 2012 Egyptian protests, Ishak urged President Mohamed Morsi to withdraw his constitutional declaration.  On 8 December, after Morsi sought to address some of the protesters' demands, Ishak said that Morsi’s new declaration "does not answer people’s demands", and the work would continue.

References

External links
 

Living people
1938 births
Cairo University alumni
Coptic Catholics
Coptic politicians
Egyptian activists
Egyptian nationalists
Egyptian people of Coptic descent
Egyptian revolutionaries
People from Port Said
People of the Egyptian revolution of 2011